Donegal East or East Donegal may refer to:

 East Donegal (UK Parliament constituency) (1885–1922), Ireland 
 Donegal East (Dáil constituency) (1937–1961), Ireland 
 East Donegal Township, Lancaster County, Pennsylvania, United States